Kangeli is a form of a Greek folk dance from Thessaly, Greece.

See also
Music of Greece
Greek dances

Greek dances
Greek music